The Georgia women's national basketball team is the women's basketball side that represents the country of Georgia in international competitions. It is governed by the Georgian Basketball Federation.

The team for several times unsuccessfully tried to qualify for the EuroBasket.

See also
 Georgia women's national under-18 basketball team
 Georgia women's national under-16 basketball team
 Georgia women's national 3x3 team

References

External links
 Official website of the Georgian Basketball Federation 
 Georgia Basketball Records at FIBA Archive

Basketball teams in Georgia (country)
Women's national basketball teams
Basketball
Basketball